Bulbophyllum mucronatum is a species of orchid in the genus Bulbophyllum. It is found in Bhutan, Thailand, western Java, Borneo, Sulawesi and the Philippines. It is found at elevations of 400 to 1200 meters above sea level.

References
The Bulbophyllum-Checklist
The Internet Orchid Species Photo Encyclopedia

mucronatum
Taxa named by Carl Ludwig Blume